The ASCAP Latin Heritage Award is an award presented by the American Society of Composers, Authors and Publishers (ASCAP) during the ASCAP Latin Awards, in "recognition of their unique and enduring contributions to Latin music". The award was first presented to Celia Cruz.

Recipients
2019 - Milly Quezada
2018 - not presented
2017 - El Gran Combo de Puerto Rico
2016 - not presented
2015 - 
2014 - Fania All-Stars
2013 - not presented
2012 - not presented
2011 - Alejandro Sanz
2010 - Armando Manzanero
2009 - Ricardo Montaner
2008 - not presented
2007 - Franco De Vita
2006 - Ricardo Arjona
2005 - not presented
2004 - Ednita Nazario
2003 - Olga Tañón
2002 - Gilberto Santa Rosa
2001 - not presented
2000 - Antonio Aguilar
1999 - Celia Cruz

References

External links
 American Society of Composers, Authors and Publishers' official site
 ASCAP Foundation

American music awards
Awards established in 1999
Latin Heritage Award
Latin music awards